Yellowhead Tribal Council is a Tribal Council representing four First Nation communities in north-central and western Alberta, Canada. The council is based in Edmonton, Alberta.

Member First Nations
Current First Nation members are:
 Alexander First Nation
 Alexis Nakota Sioux Nation
 O'Chiese First Nation
 Sunchild First Nation

References

External links
 Yellowhead Tribal Council website

First Nations tribal councils
Indigenous organizations in Alberta
First Nations in Alberta